Northern Knights was established in 2013, and accorded first-class status in 2017. Since then, they have played first-class, List A and Twenty20 cricket at a number of different home grounds. Their first home first-class match was against North West Warriors in 2017 at Stormont in Belfast.

As of 4 September 2018, Northern Knights have played four first-class matches, four List A matches, and five Twenty20 matches at seven different home grounds. The eight grounds that Northern Knights have used for home matches are listed below, with statistics complete through the end of the 2018 season.

List of grounds

See also
List of cricket grounds in Ireland

Notes

References

Northern Knights (cricket team)
Cricket grounds in Ireland
Cricket grounds in Northern Ireland